The Centre national d'études des télécommunications (French language acronym CNET, national center for telecommunication studies in English) was a French national research centre in telecommunications.

It was created on May 4, 1944 as a French interministerial research centre, but it was placed under the general supervision of the French Minister of PTT (Posts and Telecommunications).

In 1990, Directorate General of Telecommunications (DGT) (part of the French Ministry of Posts and Telecommunications) became France Télécom and CNET became the R&D (research and development) centre of France Télécom. In March 2000, CNET was renamed and became part of France Télécom R&D, the research and development division of France Télécom. This division was derived from CNET, the Centre commun d'études de télévision et télécommunications (CCETT, created in 1972) as well as other entities. Since 2007, France Telecom R&D is known as Orange Labs, a global network of R&D entities.

References 

History of telecommunications in France
Research institutes in France
Rennes